Elmore Township is one of ten townships in Daviess County, Indiana, United States. As of the 2010 census, its population was 1,113 and it contained 521 housing units.

History
Elmore Township was organized on 13 August 1821 from the northern part of Bogard Township. It was named for the Elmore family; although they were not the first settlers (they arrived in 1818, two years after the first settlement), they owned land near the township's voting location. The township's population fluctuated greatly in its early years; many individuals built boats and floated down the White River, while large numbers of people from other states settled in the township. Perhaps the most significant growth occurred in 1825, when at least five Tennessee families and at least one family from Kentucky settled in the township.

Geography
Indian Pond is in this township.

Cities and towns
 Elnora

Adjacent townships
 Cass Township, Greene County (northeast)
 Madison Township (east)
 Van Buren Township (southeast)
 Bogard Township (south)
 Steele Township (southwest)
 Vigo Township, Knox County (west)

Major highways

Cemeteries
The township contains three cemeteries: Fairview and Ketchem.

References
 
 United States Census Bureau cartographic boundary files

External links
 Indiana Township Association
 United Township Association of Indiana

Townships in Daviess County, Indiana
Townships in Indiana
1821 establishments in Indiana
Populated places established in 1821